Gary Summers is an American sound re-recording mixer.

He has done the sound re-recording on a number of blockbuster motion pictures including Avatar, Titanic, Terminator 2: Judgment Day, Saving Private Ryan, Transformers: Revenge of the Fallen and Jurassic Park. Summers has won four Oscars, an Emmy Award, two BAFTA awards and three C.A.S. Awards.

He got his start working on The Empire Strikes Back and began a twenty-year stretch working for the Skywalker Sound division of George Lucas's Lucas Digital in Marin County, California. Summers formed Summers Sound Services, Inc. in 2002 and is currently self-employed.

Academy Awards
Summers has won four Academy Awards for Best Sound and has been nominated for eight more:

Wins
 Terminator 2: Judgment Day (1991)
 Jurassic Park (1993)
 Titanic (1997)
 Saving Private Ryan (1998)

Nominated
 Return of the Jedi (1983)
 Indiana Jones and the Last Crusade (1989)
 Backdraft (1991)
 Transformers: Revenge of the Fallen (2009)
 Avatar (2009)
 Transformers: Dark of the Moon (2011)
 13 Hours: The Secret Soldiers of Benghazi (2016)
 Avatar: The Way of Water (2022)

References

External links

American audio engineers
Production sound mixers
Living people
Best Sound Mixing Academy Award winners
Best Sound BAFTA Award winners
Emmy Award winners
Year of birth missing (living people)